Red Lanta is an album by American jazz pianist Art Lande featuring Norwegian saxophonist Jan Garbarek recorded in 1973 and released on the ECM label. The title is an anagram of Art Lande's name.

Reception
According to ECM, Down Beat described it as "one of the finest albums ECM has yet released ... it is the interplay of the two artists that elicits the full richness of the music. Lande and Garbarek have intelligently channelled their virtuosity, forging a uniquely inspired vision. The result is enthralling."

The Allmusic review by Brian Olewnick awarded the album 2½ stars stating "One of the earliest recordings to embody what would come to be known as the ECM sound, Red Lanta is a series of piano/reed duets that have a Scandinavian starkness offset, somewhat unfortunately, by a soft sentimentality that verges on kitsch... this general approach proved extremely popular in the ensuing years, and devotees of ECM's later years will want to hear one of its points of germination".

Track listing
All compositions by Art Lande
 "Quintennaissance" - 5:35 
 "Velvet" - 5:37 
 "Waltz for A" - 3:43 
 "Awakening/Midweek" - 10:58 
 "Verdulac" - 7:07 
 "Miss Fortune" - 5:06 
 "Medley: Open Return/Cancion del Momento" - 5:44 
 "Meanwhile" - 4:17 
 "Cherifen Dream of Renate" - 2:06
Recorded at the Arne Bendiksen Studio in Oslo, Norway on November 19 and 20, 1973

Personnel
Art Lande — piano
Jan Garbarek — soprano saxophone, bass saxophone, flutes

References

ECM Records albums
Art Lande albums
Jan Garbarek albums
1974 albums
Albums produced by Manfred Eicher